E. B. Lewis is the name of:
E. B. Lewis (illustrator), children's book illustrator and artist
Edward B. Lewis, geneticist

See also
Lewis (surname)